Ghbaleh (also spelled Ghebaleh) is a village and municipality in the Keserwan District of the  Keserwan-Jbeil Governorate in central Lebanon. It is located 42 kilometers northeast of Beirut. Its average elevation is 890 meters above sea level and its total land area consists of 271 hectares. 

It has a population of about 3500 inhabitants. These included 1,452 registered voters in 2010. Ghbaleh's main families are Khairallah, Bou Assaf, Lteif, Ephram, Boustany, Zouein, Al Hossry, Bassil, Haddad, Tayeh, Fahed, Assaf, Awad, Atallah, Said, Ghanem, Khoury, Korkmaz, Karam, Beaino, Chelela, Hallany, Dahdah, Abi khalil, Chamy, Ziade, Abi Zeid, Saade, Fikany, Khouwairy, Najmeh and Khalil. On September 13 each year, Ghbale hosts "Eid Al Saleeb", (feast of the Cross) festival, that include a carnival, musical and religious events, attendees come from all over Lebanon, and locals living abroad. Ghbaleh's inhabitants are predominantly Maronite Christians. ."Joseph Bou Assaf” is the Mayor of Ghbaleh since 1998 until now.

Ghbaleh's 17th-century Church St. Sarkis and Bakhos is one of the major religious monuments in the region, in addition to St. Georges Church at Hakl al Rayes, St. Chalita, St. Antoine de Padoue, St. Nohra, Notre Damme du Shekiff and The Immaculate Conception Church. Ghbaleh's name is derived from "Syriac"/ S x/CSX DSC xxxc/ xcx//x/x/x/z/, and means the mount of mud. That's because the mud was used there in pottery industry..

References

Populated places in Keserwan District
Maronite Christian communities in Lebanon